Transport and Human Endeavor is the mural created in 1930  by Edward Trumbull (1884-1968) on the ceiling of the lobby of the Chrysler Building in New York City. The work was executed on canvas and cemented on the ceiling. 

The painting articulates buildings, airplanes, and portrayals of the Chrysler assembly line.

References

1930 paintings
Murals